Bizzarri is an Italian surname. Notable people with the surname include:

Albano Bizzarri (born 1977), Argentine footballer
Angela Bizzarri (born 1988), American distance runner
Marco Bizzarri (born 1962), Italian businessman, President and CEO of Gucci
Pietro Bizzarri (1525–1586), Italian historian and spy

See also
Bizzarrini, Italian automotive manufacturer 

Italian-language surnames